Samuel "Calvin" Thigpen  graduated from the University of Mississippi with Bachelor of Science in Chemistry and Math in 1999. He served as associated student body president from 1997–1998. While ASB President he led the student charge to remove the confederate flag from home football games by passing a "stick ban" in the student senate. Thigpen was the male winner of the National Collegiate Athletic Association's highest academic honor, the 1999 Walter Byers Award, in recognition of being the nation's top male scholar-athlete.  Thigpen became a Rhodes Scholar, and he returned to obtain is M.D. at University of Mississippi School of Medicine.  In Medical School Thigpen was president of his medical school class and received the Medical Student of the Year award.  He obtained his M.D. in 2005.

He subsequently completed three years of training in Internal Medicine at the University of Mississippi Medical Center, and served one additional year as Chief Resident in the Department of Internal Medicine at the same institution.  He then completed a fellowship in Hematology and Oncology at the University of Mississippi Medical Center, during which he was named "Fellow of the year" three years in a row. Currently, Thigpen serves as an clinical internist and rotating hospitalist at the University of Mississippi, as well as Program Director for the Internal Medicine Residency Program, the largest residency program at the University of Mississippi Medical Center.

Notes

American oncologists
American male long-distance runners
American Rhodes Scholars
Living people
University of Mississippi alumni
Year of birth missing (living people)
University of Mississippi Medical Center alumni